Snowboarder Magazine is a magazine dedicated to snowboarding that is published in print and online. The magazine was started in 1987. Five issues are published each year, as well as a photo annual and in addition to gear guides and a resort guide. 

In 2014, the magazine released its first movie in over a decade, The SnowboarderMovie: Foreword starring a list of amateur riders.

References

External links

Bimonthly magazines published in the United States
Sports magazines published in the United States
Magazines established in 1987
Snowboarding magazines